Jan Lella (born 6 November 1989) is a Belgian football midfielder who currently plays for RES Couvin-Mariembourg.

References

External links
 Guardian Football
 

1989 births
Living people
R. Charleroi S.C. players
Union Royale Namur Fosses-La-Ville players
Belgian footballers
Place of birth missing (living people)
Association football midfielders
R. Châtelet S.C. players